Wyoming Mills is an historic textile mill site located at 110 Chace Avenue in Fall River, Massachusetts. It is also known as the former Marshall Hat Factory site.

The Wyoming Mills company was established in 1845 by Augustus Chace and William B. Trafford for the manufacture of cotton twine.

In 1896, the site was acquired by the James Marshall & Brothers hat company, which added a large red brick mill on the site. By 1911, the company employed 1,500 people and made more than 7,200 derby hats per day.

The site was determined eligible for the National Historic Register in 1983, but taken off the list due to the owner's objection.

The site is currently owned by Duro Industries, a textile dyeing and finishing company.

See also
National Register of Historic Places listings in Fall River, Massachusetts
List of mills in Fall River, Massachusetts

References 

Industrial buildings and structures on the National Register of Historic Places in Massachusetts
Textile mills in Fall River, Massachusetts
American milliners
National Register of Historic Places in Fall River, Massachusetts